Tamar Amilakhori was a 17th-century Georgian noblewoman from the Amilakhori family and a favourite concubine of Safavid king Abbas I of Persia (r. 1588–1629).  

Tamar was a daughter of Faramarz Amilakhori and a sister of Abd-ol-Ghaffar Amilakhori. Sometime around 1619, after Abbas I ordered roughly 40,000 immigrant Georgian and Armenian families in Farahabad to conduct the Epiphany ceremony, Tamar donated some 30,000 tomans for the construction of "an all-weather paved causeway to Farrokhabad". She dedicated the act to God as an offer for Abbas I's health.

References

17th-century deaths
Iranian people of Georgian descent
Nobility of Georgia (country)
17th-century people of Safavid Iran
Safavid concubines
17th-century people from Georgia (country)
Wives of Abbas the Great